Jorge Enrique Ruffinelli Altesor (born 1943 in Uruguay) is a Uruguayan academic and critic.

Biography
In his youth he was a disciple of Ángel Rama and a contributor to the weekly Marcha. Later he was professor of Latin American Literature at the Universidad Veracruzana and Stanford University.

He is considered an expert in Latin American cinema and has participated as a jury in several international festivals.

Works
La sonrisa de Gardel (Trilce, 2004)
América Latina en 130 películas (Uqbar, 2010)
Encyclopaedia of Latin American Cinema (work in progress)

References

1943 births
Uruguayan film critics
Uruguayan academics
Uruguayan literary critics
Stanford University faculty
Living people
Academic staff of Universidad Veracruzana